Ugia insuspecta is a species of moth in the family Erebidae. It is found in China, where it has been recorded from Hong Kong.

References

Moths described in 1997
Ugia
Moths of Asia